Given two surfaces with the same topology, a bijective mapping between them exists. On triangular mesh surfaces, the problem of computing this mapping is called mesh parameterization. The parameter domain is the surface that the mesh is mapped onto.

Parameterization was mainly used for mapping textures to surfaces. Recently, it has become a powerful tool for many applications in mesh processing. Various techniques are developed for different types of parameter domains with different parameterization properties.

Applications 
 Texture mapping
 Normal mapping
 Detail transfer
 Morphing
 Mesh completion
 Mesh Editing
 Mesh Databases
 Remeshing
 Surface fitting

Techniques 
 Barycentric Mappings
 Differential Geometry Primer
 Non-Linear Methods

Implementations 
 A fast and simple stretch-minimizing mesh parameterization
 Graphite: ABF++, LSCM, Spectral LSCM
 Linear discrete conformal parameterization
 Discrete Exponential Map
 Boundary First Flattening
 Scalable Locally Injective Mappings

See also

 Parametrization
 Texture atlas
 UV Mapping

External links
 "Mesh Parameterization: theory and practice"

3D computer graphics